Casina is an Italian municipality

Casina may also refer to:
 
 Casina (architecture), an architectural form
 Casina (play), a play by Plautus